Mato Grosso do Sul is one of the Midwestern states of Brazil. Neighboring Brazilian states are (from north clockwise) Mato Grosso, Goiás, Minas Gerais, São Paulo and Paraná. It also borders the countries of Paraguay, to the southwest, and Bolivia, to the west. The economy of the state is largely based on agriculture and cattle-raising. Crossed in the south by the Tropic of Capricorn, Mato Grosso do Sul generally has a warm, sometimes hot, and humid climate, and is crossed by numerous tributaries of the Paraná River. The state has 1.3% of the Brazilian population and is responsible for 1.5% of the Brazilian GDP.

The state is also known for its natural environment, and is a destination for domestic and international tourism. The Pantanal lowlands cover 12 municipalities and presents a variety of flora and fauna, with forests, natural sand banks, savannahs, open pasture, fields and bushes. The city Bonito, in the mountain of Bodoquena, has prehistoric caves, natural rivers, waterfalls, swimming pools and the Blue Lake cave.

The name Mato Grosso do Sul is Portuguese for "Southern Thick Bush"; the name is inherited from its northern neighbour state of Mato Grosso, of which it was part until the 1970s. It is not uncommon for people to mistakenly refer to Mato Grosso do Sul as simply "Mato Grosso". Other names that were proposed, at the time of the split and afterwards, include "Pantanal" (a reference to its best known geographical feature) and "Maracaju" (a reference to the Maracaju Mountain Range that crosses the state from north to south).

Geography

Climate 

Mato Grosso do Sul has humid subtropical and tropical climates. The average annual rainfall is 1471.1 mm. January is the warmest month, with mean maximum of 34 °C (93.2 °F) and minimum of 24 °C (75.2 °F) and more rain; July experiences the coldest temperatures, with mean maximum of 25 °C (77 °F) and minimum of -2,0 °C (28 °F) and sun.

Vegetation

The "cerrado" landscape is characterized by extensive savanna formations crossed by gallery forests and stream valleys. Cerrado includes various types of vegetation. Humid fields and "buriti" palm paths are found where the water table is near the surface. Alpine pastures occur at higher altitudes and mesophytic forests on more fertile soils. The "cerrado" trees have characteristic twisted trunks covered by a thick bark, and leaves which are usually broad and rigid. Many herbaceous plants have extensive roots to store water and nutrients. The plant's thick bark and roots serve as adaptations for the periodic fires which sweep the cerrado landscape. The adaptations protect the plants from destruction and make them capable of sprouting again after the fire.

The state is located in western Brazil, in a region mostly occupied by the inland marshes of the Pantanal. The highest elevation is the 1,065 m high Morro Grande.

History
In the 1630s, the Jesuits also established short-lived missions among the Guaraní people in the Itatín region of present-day Mato Grosso do Sul, Brazil. They were destroyed by Bandeirantes and revolts by the indigenous people.

The first peoples or indigenous peoples of Mato Grosso do Sul, particularly occupying the Nhande Ru Marangatu tropical rainforested area, are the Guarani-Kaiowá, first contacted by non-indigenous peoples in the 1800s.

On October 11, 1977, the state was created by dividing the state of Mato Grosso. Its status as a state went into full effect two years later on January 1, 1979. The new state also incorporated the former territory of Ponta Porã and the northern part of the former territory of Iguaçu.

Demographics

According to the IBGE of 2008, there were 2,372,000 people residing in the state. The population density was 6.4 inhabitants/km2.

Urbanization: 84.7% (2006); Population growth: 1.7% (1991–2000); Houses: 689,000 (2006)

The last PNAD (National Research for Sample of Domiciles) census revealed the following numbers: 1,157,000 White people (51.78%), 1,056,000 Brown (Multiracial) people (44.51%), 122,000 Black people (5.15%), 20,000 Amerindian people (0.84%), 15,000 Asian people (0.64%).

In the Cerrado areas, mostly in the south, central and east, there is a predominance of Southern Brazilian farmers of Spanish, German, Portuguese, Italian and Slavic descent.

According to an autosomal DNA study from 2008, the ancestral composition of Mato Grosso do Sul is 73,60% European, 13,90% African and 12,40% Native American. Additionally, according to a different 2013 DNA study, the ancestral composition of Mato Grosso do Sul is: 58.8% European, 25.9% Amerindian and 15.3% African ancestries, respectively.

Largest cities

Education

There are more than 44 universities in whole state of Mato Grosso do Sul.

Educational institutions
 Universidade Federal de Mato Grosso do Sul (UFMS) (Federal University of Mato Grosso do Sul)
 Universidade Estadual de Mato Grosso do Sul (Uems) (State University of Mato Grosso do Sul)
 Universidade Federal da Grande Dourados (UFGD) (Federal University of Dourados Region)
 Universidade Católica Dom Bosco (UCDB) (Dom Bosco Catholic University)
 Universidade para o Desenvolvimento do Estado e da Região do Pantanal (Uniderp) (University for the Development of the State and Region of the Pantanal)

Economy
The service sector is the largest component of GDP at 46.1%, followed by the industrial sector at 22.7%. Agriculture represents 31.2%, of GDP (2004). Mato Grosso do Sul exports: soybean 34.9%, pork and chicken 20.9%, beef 13.7%, ores 8%, leather 7.4%, timber 5.1% (2002).

Share of the Brazilian economy: 1% (2005).

Agriculture

According to data from 2020, if Mato Grosso do Sul were a country, it would be the world's fifth largest producer of oilseeds. In 2020, Mato Grosso do Sul was the 5th biggest grain producer in the country, with 7.9%. In soy, produced 10.5 million tons in 2020, one of the largest producing states in Brazil, around 5th place. It's the 4th largest producer of sugarcane, with around 49 million tons harvested in the 2019/20 harvest. In 2019, Mato Grosso do Sul was also one of the largest producer of maize in the country with 10,1 million tons. In cassava production, Brazil produced a total of 17.6 million tons in 2018. Mato Grosso do Sul was the 6th largest producer in the country, with 721 thousand tons.

Livestock

The state has the 4th largest cattle herd in Brazil, with a total of 21.4 million head of cattle. The state is a major exporter of beef, but also poultry and pork. In poultry farming, the state had, in 2017, a flock of 22 million birds. In pork, in 2019, Mato Grosso do Sul slaughtered more than 2 million animals. The state occupies the 7th Brazilian position in pig farming, moving towards becoming the 4th largest Brazilian producer in the coming years.

Mining

In 2017, Mato Grosso do Sul had 0.71% of the national mineral participation (6th place in the country). Mato Grosso do Sul had production of iron (3.1 million tons at a value of R$324 million) and manganese (648 thousand tons at a value of R$299 million).

Industry

Mato Grosso do Sul had an industrial GDP of R $19.1 billion in 2017, equivalent to 1.6% of the national industry. It employs 122,162 workers in the industry. The main industrial sectors are: Public Utility Industrial Services, such as Electricity and Water (23.2%), Construction (20.8%), Food (15.8%), Pulp and Paper (15.1%) and Petroleum Derivatives and Biofuels (12.5%). These 5 sectors concentrate 87.4% of the state's industry.

In the city of Três Lagoas, the production of paper and cellulose is considerable. Mato Grosso do Sul recorded growth above the national average in the production of cellulose, reached the mark of 1 million hectares of planted eucalyptus, expanded its industrial park in the sector and consolidated itself as the largest exporter of the product in the country in the first quarter of 2020. Between 2010 and 2018, production in the south of Mato Grosso increased by 308%, reaching 17 million cubic meters of round wood for paper and cellulose in 2018. In 2019, Mato Grosso do Sul reached the leadership of exports in the product in the country, with 9.7 million tons traded: 22.20% of the total Brazilian pulp exports that year.

Infrastructure

In 2022, Mato Grosso do Sul had, between municipal, Mato Grosso do Sul state and federal highways, 45,176.8 km of municipal highways, 15,084.0 km of Mato Grosso do Sul state highways and 3,197.6 km of federal highways. In 2022 there were about 8,000 km of paved roads (between state and federal highways).  In BR-163 there were about 120 km of duplicated highways in 2022, with future planning to have a total of 847 km of duplications, crossing the entire state. Other important highways in the state are BR-262, BR-060 and BR-267. As it is a state that only became more populated in the 1970s, its transport network is in a clear process of evolution, and it continues to be a low-density road network.

The state also has two railway lines: the Estrada de Ferro Noroeste do Brasil, which connects the center-west of the state of São Paulo with the city of Corumbá, in Mato Grosso do Sul, on the of the Paraguay River, with 1,330 kilometers in length; and Ferrovia Norte Brasil, which has connected the city of Santa Fé do Sul with Rondonópolis since 1989, being one of the main corridors for the flow of grain in the region, with 755 kilometers connect the northwest of São Paulo with the south of Mato Grosso.

River navigation, once again important, is losing its pre-eminence. Two fluvial axes make up the state, both belonging to the Río de la Plata basin. The Paraguay River integrates the state with the neighboring countries Paraguay and Argentina, and with Mato Grosso through the port of Cáceres. The main products transported by the river are: iron and manganese ores, cement, wood, petroleum derivatives and cattle. In 1999, this waterway began transporting sugar, departing from Porto Murtinho. The main ports are Corumbá (Corumbá, Ladário and Porto Esperança) and Porto Murtinho. Finally, the Paraná-Tieté Waterway runs through the Paraná River.

About international Airports:

 Campo Grande - The operation of Campo Grande International Airport is shared with the Campo Grande Air Base. The airport has two runways. Construction of the main runway, made of concrete, began in 1950 and was finished in 1953. The passenger terminal was concluded in 1964, and in 1967 concrete aprons were built for both military and civilian aircraft. As commercial aviation demand grew, it became necessary to widen the civil aircraft apron, which was completed 12 years after its construction. The airport has been administered by Infraero since 1975.
 Corumbá - Corumbá International Airport, located just 3 km (1.86 mi) from the city center, was opened on September 21, 1960, the city's anniversary. Built on a land plot of 290 hectares and at an elevation of 140 meters above sea, it has an asphalt runway measuring 1660 x 30 meters, with one of its thresholds reinforced with concrete for an additional 60 meters. Corumbá International Airport has been administered by Infraero since February 1975.
 Ponta Porã - Ponta Porã International Airport is also administered by Infraero.

Other airports 
 Dourados Regional Airport
 Bonito Airport

Miscellaneous facts
Vehicles: 835,259 (June 2009);
Mobile phones: 2.407 million (July/2009); Telephones: 471,000 (April 2007); Cities: 78 (2007)

Tourism

The most important tourist city in the state is Bonito, considered the capital of ecotourism in Brazil. Its main attractions are the natural landscapes, and the immersions in rivers of transparent waters, waterfalls, caves and sinkholes. Along with Jardim, Guia Lopes da Laguna and Bodoquena, it is the main municipality that integrates the region's tourist complex.  The Pantanal is also an area of considerable visitation.

Ponta Porã, Bela Vista and Porto Murtinho, being located on the border with Paraguay, receive many visitors, and with the construction of  Bioceanic Corridor, Porto Murtinho will have a considerable increase in business tourism.

Flag
Mato Grosso do Sul's flag was designed by Mauro Michael Munhoz. A white stripe divides an upper left green corner from a bottom right blue space with a yellow star. White symbolizes hope, green is an allusion to the state's rich flora, blue represents its vast sky, while the yellow star adds balance, force and serenity. The star on the flag is Alphard, the brightest star in the constellation Hydra.

See also 
 Brazil
 Itatín
 Pantanal jaguar

References

Bibliography

External links

  Official Website
  Tourism Website

 
States of Brazil
States and territories established in 1979